The United States Department of Defense (DoD) has a complex organizational structure. It includes the Army, Navy, the Marine Corps, Air Force, Space Force, the Unified combatant commands, U.S. elements of multinational commands (such as NATO and NORAD), as well as non-combat agencies such as the Defense Intelligence Agency and the National Security Agency. The DoD's annual budget was roughly US$496.1 billion in 2015. This figure is the base amount and does not include the $64.3 billion spent on "War/Non-War Supplementals". Including those items brings the total to $560.6 billion for 2015.

Civilian control over matters other than operations is exercised through the three service departments, the Department of the Army, the Department of the Navy (which includes the Marine Corps), and the Department of the Air Force (which includes the Space Force). Each is led by a service secretary, who is below Cabinet rank.

In wartime, the Department has authority over the Coast Guard, which is under the control of the Department of Homeland Security (DHS) in peacetime. Prior to the creation of DHS, the Coast Guard was under the control of the Department of Transportation, and earlier under the Department of the Treasury. According to the U.S. Code, the Coast Guard is at all times considered one of the six armed services of the United States. During times of declared war (or by Congressional direction), the Coast Guard operates as a part of the Navy; this has not happened since World War II, but members have served in undeclared wars and conflicts since then while the service remained in its peacetime department.

The Pentagon Reservation in Arlington County, Virginia, across the Potomac River from Washington, D.C., is the Department's headquarters. The Department is protected by the Pentagon Force Protection Agency, which ensures law enforcement and security for the Pentagon and various other jurisdictions throughout the National Capital Region (NCR).

Chain of Command

The President of the United States is, according to the Constitution, the Commander-in-Chief of the U.S. Armed Forces and Chief Executive of the Federal Government. The Secretary of Defense is the "Principal Assistant to the President in all matters relating to the Department of Defense", and is vested with statutory authority to lead the Department and all of its component agencies, including military command authority second only to the President.

The President and the Secretary of Defense exercise authority and control of the Armed Forces through two distinct branches of the chain of command. One branch runs from the President, through the Secretary of Defense, to the Unified Combatant Commanders for missions and forces assigned to their commands. The other branch, used for purposes other than operational direction of forces assigned to the Unified Combatant Commands, runs from the President through the Secretary of Defense to the Secretaries of the Military Departments, i.e., the Secretary of the Army, the Secretary of the Navy, and the Secretary of the Air Force. The Military Departments, organized separately within the Department, operate under the authority, direction, and control of the Secretary of that Military Department. The Secretaries of the Military Departments exercise authority through their respective Service Chiefs (i.e., Chief of Staff of the Army, Commandant of the Marine Corps, Chief of Naval Operations,  Chief of Staff of the Air Force, and Chief of Space Operations) over forces not assigned to a Unified Combatant Command. Except as otherwise prescribed by law, the Service Chiefs perform their duties under the authority, direction, and control of the Secretaries of their respective Military Departments, to whom they are directly responsible.

In the Goldwater-Nichols Department of Defense Reorganization Act of 1986, Congress clarified the command line to the Unified Combatant Commanders and preserved civilian control of the military. The Act states that the operational chain of command runs from the President to the Secretary of Defense to the Unified Combatant Commanders. The Act permits the President to direct that communications pass through the Chairman of the Joint Chiefs of Staff from the Secretary of Defense and the Unified Combatant Commanders. This authority places the Chairman in the communications chain. Further, the Act gives the Secretary of Defense wide latitude to assign the Chairman oversight responsibilities for the Unified Combatant Commanders' activities.

Civilian control
Article II Section 2 of the Constitution designates the President as "Commander in Chief" of the Army, Navy and state militias.
The President exercises this supreme command authority through the civilian Secretary of Defense, who by federal law is the head of the department, has authority direction, and control over the Department of Defense, and is the principal assistant to the President in all matters relating to the Department of Defense. The Secretary's principal deputy is the equally civilian Deputy Secretary of Defense who is delegated full powers to act for the Secretary of Defense. The Office of the Secretary of Defense (OSD) is the Secretary and Deputy Secretary's civilian staff, which includes several Under Secretaries and Assistant Secretaries of Defense with functional oversight responsibilities. The Secretaries of the Military Departments (i.e. Secretary of the Army, Secretary of the Navy, and Secretary of the Air Force) are subordinate to the Secretary of Defense. They have the authority under Title 10 of the United States Code to conduct all the affairs of their respective departments (Department of the Army, Department of the Navy, and Department of the Air Force) within which the military services are organized.  Although subordinate to the Secretary of Defense, they are appointed by, and serve at the pleasure of, the President of the United States.  As such, they cannot be removed from office by the Secretary of Defense, but can only be removed unilaterally by the President, or through impeachment by the Congress.

Historically, there have been challenges to civilian control. Most notably, during the Korean War, General Douglas MacArthur ignored civilian instructions regarding advancing troops toward the Yalu River, which triggered an introduction of massive forces from China. Also, on April 5, 1950, Representative Joseph William Martin, Jr., the Minority Leader of the United States House of Representatives, released copies of a letter from MacArthur critical of President Harry S. Truman's limited-war strategy to the press and read it aloud on the floor of the house. President Truman relieved MacArthur of command, and MacArthur then explored political options against Truman. The Revolt of the Admirals is another example in the same era of a challenge to civilian control.

DoD policies and directives protect the policy of civilian control by establishing strict limitations on military members' political activities. For example, DoD Directive 1344.10 prohibits active-duty members of the military from running for office or making political appearances in uniform. However, enforcing this strict separation between the military and politics has been problematic. For example, over the years, many elected officials, including members of Congress, continued serving in the reserves while holding elected office. As another example, at a September 14, 2007, rally for Republican Presidential candidate John McCain in New Hampshire, seven on-duty uniformed Army personnel addressed the gathering. As another example, although DOD Directive 1344.10 prohibits political appearances by active-duty military members in uniform, Virginia Governor Bob McDonnell invited a uniformed Army Staff Sergeant to stand behind him during his televised Republican response to the 2010 State of the Union Address.

Components of the Department of Defense

Defense Agencies

Defense Agencies are established as DoD Components by law, the President, or the Secretary of Defense to provide for the performance, on a DoD-wide basis, of a supply or service activity that is common to more than one Military Department when it is determined to be more effective, economical, or efficient to do so, pursuant to sections 101, 191(a), and 192 of Title 10 of the United States Code or when a responsibility or function is more appropriately assigned to a Defense Agency. Pursuant to section 191(b) Title 10, such organizations are designated as Defense Agencies. Each Defense Agency operates under the authority, direction, and control of the Secretary of Defense, through a Principal Staff Assistant in the Office of the Secretary of Defense.

On 1 March 2003 the Secretary of Defense lost Executive Agent responsibilities for the National Communications System, which was moved to the Department of Homeland Security. However the NCS still centralized its activities within the Department of Defense, since the human resources required by NCS (example: Military Departments) still reside within the Department of Defense, or for retention of practical maintenance. The NCS was finally disestablished in 2012.

Department of Defense Field Activities

Department of Defense Field Activities are established as DoD Components by law, the President, or the Secretary of Defense to provide for the performance, on a DoD-wide basis, of a supply or service activity that is common to more than one Military Department when it is determined to be more effective, economical, or efficient to do so, pursuant to sections 101, 191(a), and 192 of Title 10 of the United States Code. Pursuant to section 191(b) of Title 10, such organizations are designated as DoD Field Activities. Each DoD Field Activity operates under the authority, direction, and control of the Secretary of Defense, through a Principal Staff Assistant in the Office of the Secretary of Defense.

Military Departments

Department of the Army

The Department of the Army includes all elements of the U.S. Army
 Secretary of the Army

Headquarters, Department of the Army

 Office of the Secretary of the Army
 Chief of Staff of the Army

Army Field Organizations

 Army Commands
 Army Component Commands
 Field Operating Agencies
 Direct Reporting Units

Department of the Navy

The Department of the Navy includes all elements of the U.S. Navy and the U.S. Marine Corps
 Secretary of the Navy

Navy Department 
 Office of the Secretary of the Navy
 Office of the Chief of Naval Operations
United States Naval Observatory falls under the Chief of Naval Operations. 
 Headquarters Marine Corps (See also: Organization of the United States Marine Corps)

Department of the Air Force

The Department of the Air Force includes all elements of the United States Air Force and the United States Space Force
 Secretary of the Air Force

 Office of the Secretary of the Air Force
 Under Secretary of the Air Force

Headquarters Air Force 
 The Air Staff
 Chief of Staff of the Air Force

Air Force Field Organizations 
 Major Commands
 Direct Reporting Units
 Field Operating Agencies

Headquarters Space Force 
 The Space Staff
 Chief of Space Operations

Space Force Field Organizations 
 Field commands

Organization of the Joint Chiefs of Staff
 Chairman of the Joint Chiefs of Staff
 Vice Chairman of the Joint Chiefs of Staff
 Joint Requirements Oversight Council
 Joint Chiefs of Staff
 The Joint Staff
 Director of the Joint Staff
 DOM- Directorate of Management
 J1 - Personnel and Manpower
 J2 - Intelligence
 J3 - Operations
 National Military Command Center
 Alternate National Military Command Center
 National Airborne Operations Center
 J4 - Logistics
 J5 - Strategic Plans and Policy
 J6 - Command, Control, Communications and Computer Systems
 J7 - Operational Plans and Joint Force Development
 J8 - Force Structure, Resources, and Assessment
 National Defense University
 College of International Security Affairs
 Industrial College of the Armed Forces
 Information Resources Management College
 Joint Forces Staff College
 National War College
 U.S. Delegation to the Inter-American Defense Board
 U.S. Delegation to the United Nations Military Staff Committee
 U.S. Representative at the NATO Military Committee
 U.S. Section, Joint Mexico-U.S. Defense Commission

Unified Combatant Commands

There are eleven Unified Combatant Commands; seven regional and four functional. Africa Command became initially operational in October 2007, while Joint Forces Command was officially disestablished on August 4, 2011. Space Command was reestablished in August 2019.

In 2007, a new geographical command for Africa was authorized. This proposed significant changes to the areas of responsibility for other adjacent geographical commands as shown in the accompanying graphic.

Office of the Inspector General of the Department of Defense

The Office of the Inspector General is an independent and objective unit within the Department of Defense that conducts and supervises audits and investigations relating to the programs and operations of the Department of Defense, pursuant to the responsibilities specified in title 5, U.S.C. Appendix and DoDD 5106.01.
 Inspector General of the Department of Defense
 Defense Criminal Investigative Service

National Guard Bureau

The National Guard Bureau (NGB) is a joint activity of the Department of Defense. The Chief of the National Guard Bureau is a principal advisor to the Secretary of Defense, through the Chairman of the Joint Chiefs of Staff, on matters involving non-federalized National Guard forces, and other matters as determined by the Secretary of Defense. For NGB matters pertaining to the Departments of the Army and Air Force's responsibilities in law or DoD policy, the Secretary of Defense normally exercises authority, direction, and control over the NGB through the Secretaries of the Army and the Air Force. The NGB is the focal point at the strategic level for National Guard matters that are not under the authority, direction, and control of the Secretaries of the Army or Air Force, including joint, interagency, and intergovernmental matters where the NGB acts through other DoD officials as specified in DoDD 5105.77.
 Chief of the National Guard Bureau

References

Further reading

 

01
United States military-related lists

United States Department of Defense